Chinese handball is a form of American handball popular on the streets of New York City, Philadelphia, and Bridgewater during the 1950s, '60s, '70s, and '80s and still played today, mostly in New York City, Philadelphia, and San Diego. Different variations are played around the world. Its defining feature is that, unlike traditional handball, in Chinese or indirect handball, for a shot to be valid, the ball must hit the ground before it hits the wall. Because it is often played with large or irregular numbers of players, it is considered a more social and accessible alternative to conventional American handball, especially in schoolyard settings.

Origin of name
The name "Chinese" handball is American in origin. Like the terms "Chinese checkers" or "Chinese fire drill", the name identifies it as an "exotic" or confusing variation on something more familiar to Westerners.

Gameplay and Rules 
Chinese handball can be played by any number of players that can comfortably fit on the court at once. In the United States, it is traditionally played with either a "Spaldeen" pink bouncy ball or an American handball ball, whereas Chinese-style Australian variations conventionally use tennis balls, and other ball options are possible. It is usually played on American handball courts, but is also often played with two opposing walls ("hallway" or "mini-court" style), or three adjacent walls. For all shots, there are several rules that must be followed for the play to be valid. The ball may be hit only once, without being "caught" or "handled", and after hitting the wall, its first bounce must land within the bounds of the court, same as in American Handball. However, after being struck and before hitting the wall, it must hit the floor. 

1v1 duels or American-style 2v2 can be played, with teams alternating hitting the ball and points awarded whenever the opposing team fails to make a valid return. However, it is usually played with larger numbers, in an elimination style. If a player makes an invalid return, they are "out", and exit the court. Whoever is closest to the ball, other than the previous hitter, is expected to hit the ball. If the ball is allowed to bounce twice without being hit or "watermeloned", whoever was nearest the ball is declared out. The person who had hit the ball last normally gets the next serve, but as a primarily social game, speed of play and flow are paramount, so whoever collects the ball may serve themselves to save time. This process continues until only one player remains, who is crowned the winner. Everyone may then reenter the court for a new round, with the reigning champion getting the first serve of the next match. 

In New York variations of the sport, "watermelons" are a risky alternative to hitting the ball. When the ball has bounced once, players may duck under the ball (usually their head is required to pass directly under the ball's flight path) to complete a watermelon. The ball is then allowed to bounce an additional time before another player must hit it, or watermelon it again. If any part of the player's body hits the ball, or the ball's next bounce lands out of bounds, the watermelon is invalid and the player who attempted it is out. Watermelons can serve as a good way to force one's opponent to the back of the court in 1v1s, to slow down the speed of play, or to catch opponents off-guard for an easy out. To prevent unfair aces, serves are often required to be "melonable", meaning someone could feasibly fit their head under the ball, and the ball's second bounce, were it to be watermeloned, would be in-bounds. Serves may be hit or thrown. 

Chinese handball, like its American relative and other playground games, is generally self-regulated. This means rules may be customized for any given match by those playing. In cases where the validity of a shot is disputed or there is disagreement over who was closest to a ball that was left to bounce twice, those outside the dispute may decide the call, or the round is replayed. Refereeing is democratic, and if most players on the court agree on a decision, the player in question is expected to accept it. There is often room for debate or talk-back, colloquially known as "fishmongering" among New York's Upper East Side Chinese Handball communities, but with rounds lasting only a few minutes, flow of play is prioritized over prolonged discussion.

Popular culture
A 2010 PBS documentary, New York Street Games, shows people playing Ace-King-Queen.

See also
American handball
Australian Handball

References

Children's games
Street games
Ball games